Pansepta teleturga is a moth in the family Xyloryctidae. It was described by Edward Meyrick in 1915. It is found on New Britain of Papua New Guinea.

The wingspan is about 22 mm. The forewings are silvery white and the hindwings are white, towards the posterior half of the costa suffused with grey.

References

Pansepta
Moths described in 1915